Norman Henry Tolk (born January 9, 1938) is an American physicist and musician.

Life 
Tolk was born in Idaho Falls, Idaho. He grew up in a Mormon and Protestant family. He majored in physics at Harvard College, graduating in 1960, and earned his Ph.D. in atomic physics from Columbia University in 1966. Currently he is a Professor of Physics and Astronomy at Vanderbilt University. For all his life Tolk has been a Mormon.

Physics 
Ever since second grade, Tolk wanted to become a physicist. After earning his degrees at Columbia and Harvard, he worked at AT&T Bell Laboratories in New Jersey. He brought the Free-electron laser to Vanderbilt. In 1987, he got the Alexander von Humboldt Award and as a result researched at Free University of Berlin.

References

External links 
 Norman Tolk's website

1938 births
Living people
21st-century American physicists
Vanderbilt University faculty
Harvard University alumni
Columbia Graduate School of Arts and Sciences alumni
Fellows of the American Physical Society